Yuraq Qaqa (Quechua yuraq white, qaqa rock, "white rock", Hispanicized spelling Yuracjaja) is a  mountain in the Wansu mountain range in the Andes of Peru, about  high. It is situated in the Apurímac Region, Antabamba Province, Juan Espinoza Medrano District. Yuraq Qaqa lies west of the peaks of Quri Pawkara and southeast of Kuntur Wasi.

References 

Mountains of Peru
Mountains of Apurímac Region